The 2021 Arizona State Sun Devils football team represented Arizona State University in the 2021 NCAA Division I FBS football season. The Sun Devils played their home games at Sun Devil Stadium in Tempe, Arizona, and competed in the South Division of the Pac-12 Conference. They were led by fourth-year head coach Herm Edwards.

Previous season

The Sun Devils finished the 2020 season 2–2 and placed fourth in the South Division. The Sun Devils had games scheduled against Northern Arizona, UNLV, and BYU, but these games were cancelled due to the Pac-12's decision to only play conference games due to the COVID–19 pandemic. Games against California, Colorado, and Utah were also cancelled due to the pandemic.

Offseason

2021 NFL draft

ASU players drafted into the NFL

Undrafted NFL free agents

Recruiting class 
The Sun Devils signed a total of 17 student–athletes on National Signing Day.

Recruits

Position key

Transfers

Outgoing

The Sun Devils lost fifteen players via transfer portal for the 2021 season.

Incoming

The Sun Devils add six players via transfer portal from the 2021 season.

Preseason

Pac-12 Media Day
The Pac-12 Media Day was held on July 27, 2021 in Hollywood, California. Arizona State head coach Herm Edwards, quarterback Jayden Daniels, and defensive back Chase Lucas were in attendance to field questions from the media.

Preseason All-Pac-12 teams

First Team

Second Team

Personnel

Roster

Arizona State roster as of week 1. (as of September 3, 2021)

Coaching staff

Graduate assistants

Analysts

Schedule

Game summaries

vs. Southern Utah

vs. UNLV

at No. 23 BYU

vs. Colorado

at No. 20 UCLA

vs. Stanford

at Utah

vs. Washington State

vs. USC

at Washington

at Oregon State

vs. Arizona

vs. Wisconsin (Las Vegas Bowl)

Rankings

References

Arizona State
Arizona State Sun Devils football seasons
Arizona State Sun Devils football